Gayle McCormick (November 26, 1948 – March 1, 2016) was an American singer, best known for her work with the rock band Smith. She attended Pattonville High School in Maryland Heights, Missouri and sang high soprano with the Suburb Choir, a 150-voice unit that performed annually with the St. Louis Symphony. Her recording and performing career stretched from 1965-76. McCormick started her career singing songs by Aretha Franklin, Gladys Knight and Tina Turner before joining Smith.

The Klassmen
In 1967, she was the lead singer in a band called Steve Cummings and The Klassmen. The band released a single in 1967 called "Without You" which had success in Missouri, and a second and final single in 1968 called "Wonderous Time".

Smith

In 1969, Smith was formed in Los Angeles, their first album titled A Group Called Smith, featured McCormick as the primary vocalist. Smith mainly played and recorded covers of pop and soul songs and made the top five with a remake of "Baby It's You", charting higher than the previous hit version by The Shirelles. Smith's version was also featured in Quentin Tarantino's film Death Proof, part of the Grindhouse double feature.

Solo
After the group disbanded, McCormick went on to record three solo albums. Gayle McCormick was released on ABC Dunhill in 1971. The following album, Flesh & Blood on Decca/MCA at Bolic Sound Studios in 1972 and One More Hour on Fantasy in 1974. In the fall of 1971, her performance of "It's A Cryin' Shame" charted at #44 on the Billboard Hot 100 and became a top 10 hit on the Adult Contemporary chart. In 1973 Gayle married and relocated to Hawaii.

McCormick recorded the tracks "Coming in Out of the Rain" and "Simon Said" for a 1975 single on the Shady Brook label; it scraped the lower reaches of the Adult Contemporary chart that fall. McCormick also contributed backing vocals to Jimmy Rabbitt and Renegade's Waylon Jennings-produced 1976 self-titled Capitol LP, from which the single "Ladies Love Outlaws" was drawn.

Death
In 2015, McCormick was hospitalized for pneumonia, and during the treatment, it was discovered that she had cancer that had metastasized from a tumor in a lung to the rest of her body. McCormick died of cancer March 1, 2016 in suburban St. Louis. She was 67 years old.

References

1948 births
2016 deaths
American sopranos
American women rock singers
Musicians from St. Louis
Dunhill Records artists
Deaths from lung cancer in Missouri
Singers from Missouri
American blues singers
21st-century American women